Saint-Joseph is a commune in the French overseas department of Réunion. It is located on the extreme south end of the island of Réunion. As such, it features the southernmost point of the European Union. The village Vincendo is part of the commune.

Geography

Climate

Saint-Joseph has a tropical monsoon climate (Köppen climate classification Am).

Population

See also
Communes of the Réunion department

References

External links

Official website (in French)

 
Communes of Réunion